Liberal USD 480 is a public unified school district headquartered in Liberal, Kansas, United States. The district includes the communities of Liberal and nearby rural areas.

Schools
The school district operates the following schools:
 Liberal High School
 Eisenhower Middle School
 Seymour Rogers Middle School
 Cottonwood Elementary School
 MacArthur Elementary School
 Meadowlark Elementary School
 Prairie View Elementary School
 Sunflower Elementary School
 Bright Start PreK Center

See also
 Kansas State Department of Education
 Kansas State High School Activities Association
 List of high schools in Kansas
 List of unified school districts in Kansas

References

External links
 

School districts in Kansas
Education in Seward County, Kansas